KJU may refer to:
Kamiraba Airport, Papua New Guinea (IATA code); see List of airports by IATA code: K
Kim Jong-un, the current leader of North Korea
2000s album by British trumpeter Mark Charig

 the High school Camille Jullian in Bordeaux